Staroye Aymanovo is a rural locality (a selo) in Aktanyshsky District of the Republic of Tatarstan, Russia, located in the lower reaches of the Belaya River, near the border with the Republic of Bashkortostan. Its population is mostly ethnic Tatars.

Notable people
Gabdulkhay Akhatov (1927–1986), a Soviet Tatar linguist and an organizer of science, was born in Staroye Aymanovo.

References

Rural localities in Tatarstan
Menzelinsky Uyezd